Arequipa Avenue, formerly known as Leguía Avenue, is one of the main avenues of Lima, Peru. It extends from north to south in the districts of Lima, Lince, San Isidro and Miraflores along 52 blocks. It has a bike path located along its entire central berm.

History
The avenue began to be opened at the beginning of the 20th century as a dividing avenue between the Campo de Marte and the Parque de la Reserva. In its beginnings, it was the road that linked Lima with the resorts of Barranco and Miraflores. It was designed by the Peruvian architect Augusto Benavides Diez Canseco.

Leguía Avenue

Leguía Avenue was created as an integrating axis with the Miraflores balneario, which was already growing as a town, and as a guideline to guide the urban expansion that the capital city was experiencing. Its physiognomy full of gardens and large houses marked it as one of the most aristocratic roads in the city, although a large part of its route still took place between fields of crops.

Arequipa Avenue
After the overthrow of Leguía by Luis Miguel Sánchez Cerro, the avenue was named Avenida de la Revolución. However, due to its insurgent character, it was decided to rename the avenue, but this time with the name of the city from where the Sánchez Cerro uprising was led: Arequipa.

But over the years, the large houses gradually disappeared and the residential air of the avenue was replaced by a large commercial activity among which the educational offer stands out since the avenue houses a large number of pre-university academies, regular schools, institutes of higher education and even universities.

References

Arequipa